Green Project–Bardiani–CSF–Faizanè is a UCI ProTeam cycling team registered in Italy that participates in UCI Continental Circuits races and when selected as a wildcard to UCI World Tour events. The team is managed by Bruno Reverberi with assistance from directeurs sportifs Fabiano Fontanelli and Roberto Reverberi. Reverberi has managed the team since 1982, when it started as Termolan. Navigare was an on-and-off title sponsor since 1990, when the team was called Italbonifica-Navigare. The current main sponsor, Bardiani Valvole, became associated with the team in 2013, prior to which CSF Group (2008–12) and Ceramica Panaria (2000–2007) were main sponsors.

Doping
On the eve of the 2017 Giro d'Italia, the UCI announced that both Stefano Pirazzi and Nicola Ruffoni had given adverse analytical findings (AAFs) for  growth hormone-releasing peptides (GHRPs) in samples collected during out-of-competition doping tests conducted on 25 and 26 April 2017. With the team incurring first and second AAFs within a twelve-month period, the UCI aimed to enforce article 7.12.1 of the UCI Anti-Doping Rules, allowing for suspension of the team from 15 to 45 days – casting doubt on their Giro appearance.

In October 2017, the team announced that Michael Bresciani had tested positive for the banned diuretic furosemide in his first race as a professional. Diuretics can be used as masking agents for other illegal doping products. The team could now face a 12-month ban due to a third doping case in a given year. Bresciani was hired by the team in order to fill the vacant spots left by Pirazzi and Ruffoni's dismissals.

Team roster

Major wins

National champions
1998
 Ukraine Road Race Championships, Vladimir Duma
2000
 Ukraine Road Race Championships, Vladimir Duma
2002
 Australia Time Trial Championships, Nathan O'Neill
2003
 Ukraine Time Trial Championships, Sergiy Matveyev
2022
 Italian Road Race Championships, Filippo Zana

References

External links
 

Cycling teams based in Italy
UCI Professional Continental teams
Cycling teams established in 1982
1982 establishments in Italy